Quintus Caecilius Metellus Macedonicus (c. 188 BC – 116 BC/115 BC) was a statesman and general of the Roman Republic during the second century BC. He was praetor in 148 BC, consul in 143 BC, the Proconsul of Hispania Citerior in 142 BC and censor in 131 BC. He got his agnomen, Macedonicus, for his victory over the Macedonians in the Fourth Macedonian War.

Career

Fourth Macedonian War

In 148 BC, as a praetor, he led Roman troops into victory over Andriscus twice. Andriscus was a self-proclaimed pretender to the Macedonian throne who claimed to be son of Perseus, last king of the Antigonid dynasty. Andriscus had risen against Rome intending to liberate Macedonia with an army recruited from Thrace. Under Metellus' authority Macedonia was reduced and made a Roman province. For that he was awarded the agnomen Macedonicus, and since then introduced the Clypeus Macedoniccus in his family's medals.

Achaean War

In 146 BC, he defeated Critolaos of Megalopolis at the Battle of Scarpheia and the Arcadians at Chaeronea but Metellus was then sent to fight in the Achaean War to avenge an insult offered to a Roman Embassy at Corinth. He fought under the command of consul Lucius Mummius Achaicus whose ultimate victory in the war against the Achaean League delayed Macedonicus from celebrating immediately the honours of the Triumph which his success at the battle of Scarpheia merited. On his return to Italy he received the honour of a Triumph and the title of Macedonicus. After his Triumph he built the Porticus Caecilii (which later became the Porticus Octaviae) at the Campus Martius. He also built two grandiose temples:  one dedicated to Jupiter and the other to Juno. These were the first marble temples in Rome, ornamented with equestrian statues of the various generals of Alexander brought by him from Greece.

Numantine War

In 143-142 BC, when consul, he campaigned against the Celtiberians in central Hispania during the Numantine War, defeating the   Arevaci, Lusones, Belli, Titii and the Vaccaei. He did not confront the city of Numantia, which then became the focus of the war and which resisted for ten years.

Politics
In 133 BC, he gave a speech attacking Tiberius Gracchus regarding that tribune's plan to bypass the traditional prerogative of the senate and keep the vast fortune of the recently deceased Attalus III of Pergamon under the control of the Plebeian Assembly.  Attalus had bequeathed his kingdom to the people of Rome.

Metellus was elected censor in 131 BC, boldly pledging to halt the growing degradation of Roman custom. In a speech which he delivered at his appointment, he proposed that matrimony was to be mandatory for all citizens, in order to put an end to the libertine behaviour then already widespread. A century later Augustus caused this speech to be read at the Senate and published as an edict for the knowledge and regeneration of the Roman People. His moralizing efforts awakened strong popular opposition, led by the tribune Gaius Atinius Labeo Macerio whom he had previously expelled from the Senate. He was almost killed by the mob on the Tarpeian Rock.

Later there were some disagreements between him and Scipio Aemilianus, but he never lost sight of the merits of this adversary, whose death he mourned, ordering his sons to transport Aemilianus' body to the crematory pyre.

Celebrated for his eloquence and his taste for the Arts, he died in 116/115 BC. He was generally respected as the paradigm of the fortunate Roman for from an illustrious birth he united all manner of civil and military honours, and left a large family of four sons, of whom one was then consul, two had already been and one would be soon. His two sons-in-law, Publius_Cornelius_Scipio_Nasica_(consul_111_BC) and Gaius Servilius Vatia would also attain the consulship.

Family
He was the oldest son of Quintus Caecilius Metellus and grandson of Lucius Caecilius Metellus.

He was the father of: 
 Quintus Caecilius Metellus Balearicus
 Lucius Caecilius Metellus Diadematus
 Marcus Caecilius Metellus
 Gaius Caecilius Metellus Caprarius
 Caecilia Metella, born c. 170 BC, wife of Publius Cornelius Scipio Nasica
 Caecilia Metella, born c. 170 BC, wife of Gaius Servilius Vatia
 Caecilia Metella, wife of Quintus Servilius Caepio

In popular culture

Metellus was played by Gordon Mitchell in the 1961 film The Centurion.

"Metellus raising the siege", a painting by Armand-Charles Caraffe, commemorates the legend of Metellus lifting the siege of Centobrigia in 142 BC, in order to spare the lives of innocents.

In-text citation

Sources
UNRV.com
 Stockton, David.  The Gracchi, Oxford University Press, Oxford ENG; 1979.

Attribution

180s BC births
110s BC deaths
2nd-century BC Roman augurs
2nd-century BC Roman consuls
2nd-century BC Roman generals
2nd-century BC Roman praetors
Macedonicus, Quintus
Roman censors
Roman governors of Macedonia
Year of birth uncertain
Year of death uncertain